Charrúa is an extinct Charruan language historically spoken by the Charrúa people in southern Uruguay.

References

Charruan languages
Extinct languages of South America
Chaco linguistic area